Taming the Tiger is the sixteenth studio album by the Canadian musician Joni Mitchell. Released on September 29, 1998 through Reprise Records, it is the follow-up to the successful Turbulent Indigo (1994). The album was, at the time, widely believed to be her last of completely original material; this would be disproved with the release of Shine in 2007.

Contributors to Taming the Tiger include Larry Klein on bass and Wayne Shorter on saxophone. The album combines the jazz stylings of much of her work with a textured, ambient-esque sound, indebted to her use of the Roland VG-8 virtual guitar system.

Taming the Tiger did not achieve the same level of success as its predecessor, peaking at number 86 in Mitchell's native Canada and number 75 in the US. However, it received positive reviews from critics and was considered a continuation of a return to form which started with Night Ride Home (1991).

Background

Taming the Tiger features prominent use of the Roland VG-8 virtual guitar system. This setup allowed Mitchell to switch between different alternate tunings with the press of a button rather having to retune the guitar between each song – the frustration of which was a main factor in her decision to give up touring after 1983. While the guitar remained in standard tuning, its sound would be processed to create the sound of the alternate tuning she had chosen. The unique sound of the guitar, described by David Yaffe in Reckless Daughter: A Portrait of Joni Mitchell as "a computerized approximation of a guitar with a head cold", created a more atmospheric, ambient sound which is prevalent throughout the album.

Notable covers
"Man from Mars" was covered by Kristen Vigard in the 1996 film, Grace of My Heart.
"Man from Mars" was also covered by Chaka Khan in 2000 for her live concert DVD The Jazz Channel Presents Chaka Khan.

Track listing
All tracks composed and arranged by Joni Mitchell; except where indicated

"Harlem in Havana" – 4:25
"Man from Mars" – 4:09
"Love Puts on a New Face" – 3:46
"Lead Balloon" – 3:38
"No Apologies" – 4:17
"Taming the Tiger" – 4:18
"The Crazy Cries of Love" (music: Joni Mitchell; lyrics: Don Freed) – 3:54
"Stay in Touch" – 2:59
"Face Lift" – 4:41
"My Best to You" (Gene Willadsen, Isham Jones) – 2:52
"Tiger Bones" – 4:18

Personnel 
Musicians
 Joni Mitchell – vocals, backing vocals, guitar, keyboards, percussion; bass (tracks 2, 5, 10)
 Femi Jiya – spoken vocals (barker) on "Harlem in Havana"
 Michael Landau – low lead guitar on "Lead Balloon"
 Greg Leisz – pedal steel guitar
 Wayne Shorter – saxophone
 Larry Klein – bass
 Brian Blade – drums
 Mark Isham – trumpet (track 8)

Production
 Dan Marnien, Tony Phillips, Femi Jiya – engineer
 Joni Mitchell, Dan Marnien – mixing
 Joni Mitchell, Robbie Cavolina – art direction

Charts

References

Joni Mitchell albums
1998 albums
Reprise Records albums
Albums with cover art by Joni Mitchell
Albums produced by Joni Mitchell